Sympistis toddi is a species of moth in the family Noctuidae (the owlet moths).

The MONA or Hodges number for Sympistis toddi is 10153.

References

Further reading

 
 
 

toddi
Articles created by Qbugbot
Moths described in 1968